Moxahala Creek is a tributary of the Muskingum River, 29.2 miles (47.0 km) long, in southeastern Ohio in the United States.  Via the Muskingum and Ohio Rivers, it is part of the watershed of the Mississippi River, draining an area of 

Moxahala Creek rises in southeastern Perry County and flows generally northward into southern Muskingum County, past Crooksville and Roseville.  It joins the Muskingum River at South Zanesville.

It was historically also known as Jonathan's Creek.

See also
List of rivers of Ohio

References

External links
 

Rivers of Ohio
Muskingum River
Rivers of Muskingum County, Ohio
Rivers of Perry County, Ohio